The Église Saint-Maurice is a church on Rue Pierre-Mauroy, in the historic centre of Lille, northern France. Its construction began at the end of the 14th century and completed at the end of the 19th century, and it was extended over more than four centuries. A hall church in the Gothic style, it was made a monument historique in 1914.

Gallery

Stained Glass

Statues

References

External links 

Official site
Official site of the mairie de Lille : Église Saint Maurice

Maurice
Monuments historiques of Nord (French department)